Kristian Breivik Jacobsen (born 17 January 1992 in Bodø, Norway) is a Norwegian bassist.

Biography 
Jacobsen studied music at Norwegian Academy of Music (2012–2013) before joining the jazz program at Norwegian University of Science and Technology (2013–2016).

He is part of the Norwegian soul/jazz quartet Rohey together with vocalist Rohey Taalah, keyboardist and composer Ivan Blomqvist and drummer Henrik Lødøen. Together they have toured all over Scandinavia and Europe, and visited most jazz festivals and venues available. Rohey released their debut album A Million Things in 2017 on the label Jazzland Recordings.

Honors 

 2018: Nominated to This year's newcomer and Gramo scolorship during Spellemannsprisen as part of Rohey
 2015: Young Talents Scholarship by Norwegian Association for Composers and Lyricists

Discography

With Rohey 

 2017: A Million Things (Jazzland Recordings)

With DRØM 

 2017: Drømmen Om Oss (Vilje Recordings)

With Lukas Zabulionis 

 2016: Changing Tides (Curling Legs)

References

External links 
 ROHEY - I Found Me (Live at Rockefeller)
 ROHEY - Is This All There Is? (Live at Tivoli Vredenburg Utrecht)

1992 births
Living people
Norwegian jazz composers
21st-century Norwegian upright-bassists
Avant-garde jazz double-bassists
Norwegian jazz upright-bassists
Male double-bassists
Avant-garde jazz musicians
Spellemannprisen winners
Musicians from Bodø
21st-century Norwegian male musicians